Project Runway All Stars (Season 3) is the third season of the Project Runway spin-off series Project Runway All Stars. It features 11 designers from previous seasons of the original series with Alyssa Milano acting as the new host, taking over Carolyn Murphy's role in season 2. Georgina Chapman and Isaac Mizrahi returned as judges for this season. Zanna Roberts Rassi replaced Joanna Coles, mentoring contestants. The season premiered on Lifetime on October 24, 2013.

Guest judges included Abigail Breslin, Kristin Chenoweth, Gabourey Sidibe, Elisabeth Moss, Nick Cannon, Debbie Harry, Bar Refaeli, Gayle King, Nate Berkus, and Michael Urie. Original series judge Nina Garcia and newcomer judge Zac Posen, along with previous Runway winners Christian Siriano (season 4) and Anya Ayoung-Chee (season 9), as well as two All Stars winners Mondo Guerra and Anthony Ryan Auld appeared. Marge Simpson also made a special appearance.

Judges 
American model and actress Alyssa Milano serves as the host as well as a judge. Designers Isaac Mizrahi and Georgina Chapman also judge the 11 returning designers which, for the first time, include winners of the original series as cast members.

Designers
Names and locales per official site:

Models

 Raychael Arianna Jackson
 Noelle McKenzie
 Tatjana Sinkevica
 Kelly Brown
 Manon Krol
 Andrea "Shei" Phan
 Alice Contreiras
 Brianna "Nana" Flores
 Kelly Thomas
 Jenny Kafka
 Amy Row

Designer Progress

 The designer won Project Runway All Stars.
 The designer won the challenge.
 The designer came in second but did not win the challenge.
 The designer had one of the highest scores for the challenge but did not win.
 The designer had a low score, but was not in the bottom two.
 The designer was in the bottom two but was not eliminated.
 The designer lost the challenge and was eliminated from the competition.

Rate The Runway Results

Episodes

Episode 1: You Got Punked! 
Original airdate: October 24, 2013

Fashion-forward punk looks are created in the Season 3 opener. 
 Guest Judge: Debbie Harry
 WINNER: Elena
 ELIMINATED: Ari

Episode 2: Bitten by the Fashion Bug 
Original airdate: October 31, 2013

 Arthropods inspire avant-garde fashions.
 Guest Judges: Anya Ayoung-Chee & Jennifer Meyer
 WINNER: Mychael
 ELIMINATED: Daniel

Episode 3: Sip Into Something Sexier 
Original airdate: November 7, 2013

 The designers have to create high-end cocktail dresses and seek their inspirations at Jay Z's 40/40 Club.
 Guest Judges: Nate Berkus & Rebecca Minkoff
 WINNER: Viktor
 ELIMINATED: Melissa

Episode 4: Keepin' It Classy 
Original airdate: November 14, 2013

 The designers have to create a high impact fashion look from unconventional material found in an elementary school.
 Guest Judges: Michael Urie & Gabourey Sidibe
 WINNER: Christopher
 ELIMINATED: None

Episode 5: Partners In Crime 
Original airdate: November 21, 2013

 Working in teams of two the designers have to create young modern looks inspired by Lifetime's new series Bonnie & Clyde of '30s.
 Guest Judges: Bar Refaeli & Elie Tahari & Austin Scarlett (sitting in for  Georgina Chapman ) 
 WINNER: Jeffrey
 ELIMINATED: Mychael

Episode 6: Marge Madness
Original airdate: December 5, 2013
 On November 28, 2013 no episode was aired due to Thanksgiving in the United States.
 Marge Simpson from The Simpsons asks the Allstar Designers to design an exciting night dress for a date with Homer.
 Guest Judges: Anthony Ryan Auld (sitting in for  Georgina Chapman )& Stacey Bendet & Abigail Breslin
 WINNER: Irina
 ELIMINATED: Jeffrey

Episode 7: As Sewn On T.V.
Original airdate: December 12, 2013

 Only six designers remain. At headquarter of QVC they are asked to design a red carpet dress. 
 Guest Judges: Mondo Guerra (sitting in for  Georgina Chapman ) & QVC® Program Host Lisa Robertson & Elisabeth Moss
 WINNER: Korto
 ELIMINATED: Irina

Episode 8: Nina's Trending 
Original airdate: December 19, 2013

 The remaining designers meet with fashion bloggers to discuss 2014 trends. 
 Guest Judges: Nina Garcia & Christian Siriano (sitting in for  Georgina Chapman ) & Francisco Costa
 WINNER: Korto
 ELIMINATED: Viktor

Episode 9: Fashion Cents 
Original airdate: January 2, 2014

 The remaining four designers have to create a ready to wear look in order to make it to the finale.
 Guest Judges: Michelle Smith & Nick Cannon & Kristin Chenoweth
 WINNER: Seth Aaron
 ELIMINATED: Christopher

Episode 10: Finale: Are U.N. or Are You Out? 
Original airdate: January 9, 2014

  In the Season 3 finale, the designers showcase their collections at a VIP runway show at the United Nations Headquarters, after which the winner is revealed.
 Guest Judges: Gayle King & Zac Posen
 WINNER: Seth Aaron
 ELIMINATED: Korto & Elena

References 

All Stars Season 03
2013 American television seasons
2014 American television seasons
2013 in fashion
2014 in fashion
2013 in American television
2014 in American television